The western citril (Crithagra frontalis), also known as the yellow-browed citril, is a species of finch in the family Fringillidae.  It is found in central Africa.

The western citril was formerly placed in the genus Serinus but phylogenetic analysis using mitochondrial and nuclear DNA sequences found that the genus was polyphyletic. The genus was therefore split and a number of species including the western citril were moved to the resurrected genus Crithagra.

References

western citril
Birds of Central Africa
Birds of Sub-Saharan Africa
Birds of East Africa
western citril
Taxonomy articles created by Polbot